Manganese oxide is any of a variety of manganese oxides and hydroxides. These include

 Manganese(II) oxide, MnO
 Manganese(II,III) oxide, Mn3O4
 Manganese(III) oxide, Mn2O3
 Manganese dioxide, MnO2
 Manganese(VI) oxide, MnO3
 Manganese(VII) oxide, Mn2O7

Other manganese oxides include Mn5O8, Mn7O12 and Mn7O13.

Minerals 
It may refer more specifically to the following manganese minerals: 

 Birnessite, 
 Buserite, 
 Hausmannite, 
 Manganite, MnO(OH)
 Manganosite, MnO
 Psilomelane, or 
 Pyrolusite, 

Manganese may also form mixed oxides with other metals :

 Bixbyite, a manganese(III) iron(III) oxide mineral
 Jacobsite, a manganese(II) iron(III) oxide mineral
 Columbite, a niobate of iron(II) and manganese(II)
 Tantalite, a tantalum(V) mineral group close to that of columbite
 Coltan, a mixture of columbite and tantalite series
 Galaxite, a spinel mineral
 Todorokite, a rare complex hydrous manganese oxide mineral

References

Manganese compounds
Manganese minerals
Oxide minerals
Transition metal oxides